The paracentral sulcus is a sulcus of the brain. It forms the paracentral lobule's anterior border. It is part of the cingulate sulcus.

Gallery

References

External links

 https://web.archive.org/web/20090505144011/http://anatomy.med.umich.edu/atlas/n1a2p12.html

Cerebrum
Sulci (neuroanatomy)